Kirk Yetholm ('kirk yet-ham') is a village in the Scottish Borders region of Scotland,  southeast of Kelso and less than  west of the border. The first mention is of its church in the 13th century. The population of the two villages was recorded as 591 in the 2001 census.

Etymology 

Yetholm means either:

 the goats' island from Old English gat 'goat' and Old Norse holmr (island, holme)
 village with a gate - from Old English geat-ham ‘gate village’

Gypsies 

Kirk Yetholm was the headquarters of the Romanichal travellers (gypsies) in Scotland, having settled in the village about 1750.  The last King of the Gypsies, Charles Faa Blyth Rutherford, aged 70, was crowned on 31 May 1898.  A second male, David Blyth, claimed he was the rightful heir, but did not attend the huge ceremony and festivities which was held between the two Yetholm villages.  The king died just four years later on 21 April 1902.  Today the gypsies have been integrated and are no longer a separate ethnic minority.  A memorial stone can be found on the village green.

Saint Cuthbert's Way and Pennine Way 

The village is notable for being the northern terminus of the Pennine Way, and to a lesser extent the southern terminus of the Scottish National Trail. The Border Hotel public house is the official end of the Pennine Way.

Saint Cuthbert's Way also passes through the village, going between Melrose, Scotland and Lindisfarne (Holy Island), Northumberland.

Youth hostel 

In 1942 the village school building was converted into a Scottish Youth Hostels Association hostel. It now continues in use as an affiliate hostel named the Kirk Yetholm Friends of Nature House.  It provides accommodation for tourists, particularly walkers and cyclists, being located on Saint Cuthbert's Way, the Pennine Way, the Scottish National Trail, the Sustrans National Cycle Route 1 and Scottish Borders Loop.

Activities 

The first Saturday in October is traditionally the Yetholm Border Shepherds' Show, held on the land between Town Yetholm and Kirk Yetholm, with the 156th show held in 2019.  It stemmed from the old practice of farmers gathering  to sort through stray sheep from neighbours' flocks.  

A song referring to Kirk Yetholm called "Yetholm Day" was written and composed by Gary Cleghorn.

Ogilvie also wrote a song for the 'Coronation of the Gipsy King at Yetholm' by July 1898 whilst in Australia.

Gallery

See also

Town Yetholm
List of places in the Scottish Borders
List of places in Scotland

Further reading

The Kirk Yetholm Gypsies is available from the Hawick Archaeological Society website.

References

External links

 Royal Commission on the Ancient and Historical Monuments of Scotland
 Scotland's Places
 SCRAN image: Roy map of Kirk Yetholm
 Gazetteer for Scotland: Map of Kirk Yetholm
 Yetholm Community Council website Yetholm Online
 Yetholm Parish Church website Cheviot Churches

Historic Romani communities
Villages in the Scottish Borders
Romani communities in the United Kingdom